Edward George Hampson (born December 11, 1936) is a Canadian former professional ice hockey centre, who played in the National Hockey League and World Hockey Association during the 1960s and 70s. Ted is the father of Gord Hampson.

Career
Ted Hampson, as Captain of the Flin Flon Bombers, won the Memorial Cup in 1957.  A significant achievement for a small town hockey team in Northern Manitoba playing in the SJHL. 

Hampson was drafted by the Toronto Maple Leafs and began his professional career in 1959.  Hampson was awarded the Bill Masterton Memorial Trophy in 1969 while playing for the Oakland Seals. He retired from the National Hockey League (NHL) following the 1971–72 season, and went on to play five seasons in the World Hockey Association (WHA). The WHA awarded him the Paul Deneau Trophy (Most Gentlemanly Player) in 1973 as a member of the Minnesota Fighting Saints. Hampson recorded 108 goals, 245 assists, 353 points, and a mere 94 penalty minutes in 676 NHL games. In 305 WHA appearances Hampson tallied 60 goals, 143 assists, 203 points, and 51 penalty minutes.  Hampson was Captain of the Oakland Seals (NHL) and Minnesota Fighting Saints (WHA).

Hampson was the general manager and player-coach for the Oklahoma City Stars of the Central Hockey League from 1978 to 1981; at the age of 45 in his final stint, one of the oldest men ever to play professional hockey.  After his playing career, Hampson began a long time Amateur Scouting career that spanned another 40 years.  He started with Central Scouting, lead the amateur scouting for the St. Louis Blues and Colorado Avalanche, and then joined the Vancouver Canucks, whom he scouted for until retiring in July 2022 at the age of 85.

Career statistics

Regular season and playoffs

Awards and achievements
 SJHL First All-Star Team (1957)
 SJHL Championship (1957)
 Memorial Cup Championship (1957)
 Bill Masterton Trophy Winner (1969)
 Paul Deneau Trophy Winner (1973)
 Played in NHL All-Star Game (1969)
 Honoured Member of the Manitoba Hockey Hall of Fame

External links

Ted Hampson's biography at Manitoba Hockey Hall of Fame

1936 births
Living people
Baltimore Clippers players
Bill Masterton Memorial Trophy winners
Brandon Regals players
California Golden Seals players
Canadian ice hockey centres
Canadian ice hockey coaches
Colorado Avalanche scouts
Detroit Red Wings players
Flin Flon Bombers players
Ice hockey people from Saskatchewan
Ice hockey player-coaches
Minnesota Fighting Saints players
Minnesota North Stars players
New York Rangers players
Oakland Seals players
Pittsburgh Hornets players
Providence Reds players
Quebec Nordiques (WHA) players
Rochester Americans players
St. Louis Blues scouts
Toronto Maple Leafs players
Vancouver Canucks scouts
Vancouver Canucks (WHL) players